Sodium MRI (also known as 23Na-MRI) is a specialised magnetic resonance imaging technique that uses strong magnetic fields, magnetic field gradients, and radio waves to generate images of the distribution of sodium in the body, as opposed to more common forms of MRI that utilise protons  (or hydrogen) present in water (1H-MRI). Like the proton, sodium is naturally abundant in the body, so can be imaged directly without the need for contrast agents or hyperpolarization. Furthermore, sodium ions play a role in important biological processes via their contribution to concentration and electrochemical gradients across cellular membranes, making it of interest as an imaging target in health and disease.

In contrast to conventional MRI of the proton, Sodium MRI is complicated by the low concentrations of Na nuclei relative to concentration of H2O molecules in biological tissues (10-45 mM) and the lower gyromagnetic ratio of the 23Na nucleus as compared to a 1H nucleus,. This causes low NMR sensitivity and the requirement for a stronger magnetic field for equivalent spatial resolution. The quadrupolar 23Na nucleus also has a faster transverse relaxation rates and multiple quantum coherences as compared to the 1H nucleus, requiring specialized and high performance MRI sequences to capture information before the contrast used to image the body is lost.

Biological significance
Tissue sodium concentration (TSC) is tightly regulated by healthy cells and are altered by energy status and cellular integrity, making it an effective marker for disease states. Cells maintain a low intracellular Na+ concentration by actively pumping Na ions out via the Na+/K+ ATPase channel, and any challenge to the cell’s metabolism causing low ATP supply or compromise of the cell’s membrane integrity will drastically increase intracellular Na+ concentrations. After exhaustive exercise, for example, 23Na MRI can detect Na+ levels in tissues rising sharply, and can even visualize a sodium-rich meal in a patient’s stomach. Malignant tumors in particular alter their metabolism drastically, often to account for hypoxic intratumor conditions, leading to an decrease in cytosolic pH. To compensate, Na+ ions from the extracellular space are exchanged for protons in the Na+/H+ antiport, the loss of which often attenuates cancer growth. Therefore, 23Na MRI is a useful clinical tool for detecting a number of disease states, including heart disease and cancer, as well as monitoring therapy. For example, 23Na MRI has been shown to measure cellularity in ovarian cancer. Tissue damage in stroke patients can also be evaluated using 23Na MRI, with one study showing that a change of 50% higher TSC than the TSC in healthy brain tissue is consistent with complete infarction, and therefore can be used to determine tissue viability and treatment options for the patient. Tumor malignancy can also be evaluated based on the increases in TSC of rapidly proliferating cells. Malignant tumors have approximately 50-60% increased TSC relative to that of healthy tissues – however, increases in TSC cannot be determined to be due to changes in extracellular volume, intracellular sodium content or neovascularization. Another interesting use of 23Na MRI is in evaluating multiple sclerosis, wherein accumulation of sodium in axons can lead to axon degeneration. Preliminary studies have shown that there is a positive correlation between elevated TSC and disability.

Uses in Prostate Cancer
Recently, work has been undertaken to assess the utility of using sodium-MRI to characterize prostate cancer lesions in men. In this study, patients were imaged with sodium MRI prior to surgical removal of the prostate. TSC was extracted from the images and compared to the Gleason score of imaged lesions. This work showed statistically significant increases in TSC as prostate cancer increased in aggression. This preliminary study suggests that sodium MRI can accurately characterize the stage of prostate cancer. This suggests the potential use of sodium-MRI to better management and stage patients with prostate cancer into treatment schemes.

Advantages
23Na MRI measures cellular metabolic rate as well as disease-related change in tissues and organs. It had improved from 45min length to only 15 mins at 1.5T.  Unlike other MRI scanning, sodium MRI captures only sodium signals inside bodies. For cartilage degeneration, proteoglycan degrades with negative charge, and positively charged sodium ion bond with proteoglycan. Both proteoglycan and sodium level decrease, so less signals are observed by sodium MRI. 23Na MRI is very sensitive and specific to change in proteoglycan, so it is good to use for monitoring of proteoglycan degeneration in cartilage.

References

Magnetic resonance imaging